MV Nicola is an , owned, but not operated by BC Ferries. It is also known as Spirit of Lax Kw Alaams, a British Columbia First Nations name. Spirit of Lax Kw Alaams currently runs between Prince Rupert and Port Simpson, (also known as Lax Kw'alaams) a British Columbia First Nations community on British Columbia's North Coast. Overnight the vessel is kept at the Smit tugboat dock in Prince Rupert Harbour.

In December 2009 Sahar Nassimdoost reported that a new dock was under construction in Prince Rupert for use by Spirit of Lax Kw Alaams. The BC government report on the project mentions that the new Prince Rupert dock will be near Aero Point and cost 2,976,300.00 with an expected completion time of June 2010.

Statistics
Built: Vancouver BC
Launched: 1960
Vehicle capacity: 16
Passenger Capacity: 133
Length: 33.8 metres
Gross Tons: 255
Service Speed: 10 knots
Horsepower: 680

Sources:

Sister ships
 
 
Nicola is the sister ship of MV Nimpkish, it is the smallest ship owned by B.C ferries. But, the Nimpkish was tied as the smallest ship owned by B.C. Feries (BCFS). However, Nimpkish was both owned and operated by BCFS, but was sold in 2020.  A second sister ship, MV Albert J Savoie, was sold from BC Ferries to Rainy day Logging during the summer of 2002.

References

External links
BC Ferries Homepage

N-class ferries
1960 ships
Ships built in British Columbia
North Coast of British Columbia
Transport in Prince Rupert, British Columbia